Howard William Reed (September 29, 1883 – November 24, 1942) was an American politician. He was a member of the Arkansas House of Representatives, serving from 1919 to 1925. He was a member of the Democratic party.

References

1942 deaths
1883 births
20th-century American politicians
People from Mankato, Kansas
Speakers of the Arkansas House of Representatives
Democratic Party members of the Arkansas House of Representatives